Stephen Reese (born January 7, 1952 in Columbus, Georgia) is a former National Football League linebacker who played for the New York Jets and Tampa Bay Buccaneers from 1974 to 1976. He attended William H. Spencer High School and then the University of Louisville before being signed by the Jets.

References

Living people
1952 births
New York Jets players
Tampa Bay Buccaneers players
American football linebackers
Louisville Cardinals football players